Špela Rogelj (born 8 November 1994) is a retired Slovenian ski jumper.

Career

Early years
Rogelj began her ski jumping career at the age of thirteen, competing in Dobbiaco on 23 January 2008. This took place at Continental Cup level. She later competed in the 2009 Ski Jumping World Championships in Liberec, finishing 30th. Two years later she finished second in the Junior World Championships in Otepää on 27 January 2011, beaten only by Coline Mattel. Her best result in the Continental Cup is second place, achieved on 29 November 2011 in Rovaniemi.

World Cup career
At World Cup level she won her first individual event in Lillehammer on 5 December 2014, which gave her the lead of the women's standings until the following event in Sapporo on 11 January 2015. As the season progressed, she was unable to maintain her early form and finished fourth overall in the 2014–15 women's World Cup; it was nonetheless her highest ever ranking in the World Cup.

World Cup record

Standings

Individual wins

References

External links

Living people
1994 births
Skiers from Ljubljana
Slovenian female ski jumpers
Olympic ski jumpers of Slovenia
Ski jumpers at the 2014 Winter Olympics
Ski jumpers at the 2018 Winter Olympics
Ski jumpers at the 2022 Winter Olympics
FIS Nordic World Ski Championships medalists in ski jumping
21st-century Slovenian women